Marcel Felder and Antonio Veić were the defending champions but decided not to participate.
Dominik Meffert and Philipp Oswald won the title by defeating Alessandro Giannessi and Potito Starace 6–2, 6–3 in the final.

Seeds

Draw

Draw

References 
 Main Draw

Citta di Caltanissetta - Doubles
2013 Doubles